Labour or labor may refer to:
 Childbirth, the delivery of a baby
 Labour (human activity), or work
 Manual labour, physical work 
 Wage labour, a socioeconomic relationship between a worker and an employer
 Organized labour and the labour movement, consisting principally of labour unions
 The Labour Party (UK)

Literature
 Labor (journal), an American quarterly on the history of the labor movement
 Labour/Le Travail, an academic journal focusing on the Canadian labour movement
 Labor (Tolstoy book) or The Triumph of the Farmer or Industry and Parasitism (1888)

Places
 La Labor, Honduras
 Labor, Koper, Slovenia

Other uses
 Labor (album), a 2013 album by MEN
 Labor (area), a Spanish customary unit
 "Labor", an episode of TV series Superstore
 Labour (constituency), a functional constituency in Hong Kong elections
 Labors, fictional robots in Patlabor

People with the surname
 Earle Labor (born 1928), professor of American literature
 Jérémy Labor (born 1992), French footballer
 Josef Labor (1842–1924), Austrian musician and composer

See also 
 Labor Day (disambiguation)
 Labour law
 Labour Party (disambiguation)
 Work (disambiguation)